Front Page (Chinese: 新半斤八兩) is a 1990 Hong Kong comedy film directed by Philip Chan and starring Michael Hui, Samuel Hui and Ricky Hui. The film is a remake of the Hui Brothers' 1976 film, The Private Eyes.

Plot
Hui (Michael Hui) is the chief editor of "Truth Weekly" (內幕周刊), which is based on intellectual contents, resulting in sluggish sales. Because of this, the magazine company is on the verge for closure. Martial arts instructor Mad Bill (Samuel Hui) was recently dismissed from his job and applies for a position at the magazine company. Bill proposes to Hui that they convert the magazine to cover entertainment news, especially scandals involving female celebrities. Hui accepts this idea, and the two of them and employee Fly (Ricky Hui) will fabricate gossip to support a headline for the next issue.

This trio decide to spy on Sandy Cheung (Catherine Hung), who has a reputation for purity and innocence in the entertainment industry, and is to marry the son of jewellery magnate. They follow her to a beauty salon, planning to take photos of her having a breast transplant, hoping to cause a scandal, but she turns out to be there for routine skin care. Later, they play dumb and gain Sandy's sympathy to get close to her, and succeed in taking intimate pictures of Sandy with Bill, to support an infidelity scandal about her.

The night before publishing the news, when Bill and Fly's conscience caught up with them, they take the negatives of the photos and returns them to Sandy at her engagement party. However, they encounter robbers who have seized control of the venue and takes Sandy hostage to threaten her fiancé to hand them all of the jewellery from his jewellery shop. At this time, Hui, Bill and Fly also snap a large amount of photos of the robbery scene there. Sandy's fiancé refuses to hand over his property, putting Sandy's life on the line. Fortunately, Bill rescues her and repels the robbers with his martial arts skills. Finally, "Truth Weekly" was resurrected by the report of the robbery and attracted a large sale. The robbers, who attempted to flee from Hong Kong, were also apprehended. Hui and his staff were awarded Good Citizen Awards and HK $800,000 cash by the police force, while Bill also wins Sandy's heart.

Cast
Michael Hui as Hui (老許), boss and chief editor of "Truth Weekly" (內幕周刊)
Samuel Hui as Mad Bill Lee (喪標), newcomer staff of "Truth Weekly" who had jobs as a salesman, taxi driver and martial arts instructor prior
Ricky Hui as Fly (烏蠅), a staff member of "Truth Weekly"
Catherine Hung as Sandy Cheung (張珊珊), a celebrity
Louise Lee as Mrs. Hui, Hui's wife
Lau Siu-ming as Brother Shun (順哥), chief of the robbers
Teresa Mo as Mrs. Ho (何雅祺), proprietor of "Truth Weekly's" office 
Paul Chun as Dr. Pong (龐醫生), a plastic surgeon
Joe Tay as Sang (阿生), a staff member of "Truth Weekly"
Winnie Lau as Pinky (萍萍), a staff member of "Truth Weekly"
Tai Po as an angry stuntman after Hui
Bonnie Fu as Robert's sister-in-law
Yu Sin-man as Anita Mui
Lee Hoi-sang as Dragon
Lai Man-cheuk as Sloppy
Teddy Yip as Kent (錦叔), a staff member of "Truth Weekly"
May Law as May (八婆薇), a staff member of "Truth Weekly"
Tsang Kan-wing as Mr. Leung (梁主任), a bank staff
Stanley Hui as Police Commissioner
Lawrence Lau as a martial arts student
Yuen Shun-yee as martial arts master
Chan Ka-pik as Dr. Pong's receptionist
Mak Yan-wa as Dr. Pong's assistant
Chiu Yun-kan as Robert Li
Nip Pang-fung as a robber
Wan seung-lam as a robber
Chu Tat-wai as a robber
Kingdom Yuen as a late guest at Robert's ball
Lau Chan-au as a late guest at Robert's ball
Yu Kin-shing as Wong, a chauffeur
Law Shu-kei as the orphanage principal
Melvin Wong
Roger Thomas as a party guest
Ho Chi-moon as a party guest
Cho Sai as a party guest
Lee Wah-kon as a party guest
Ng Wing-sum as a martial arts student

Music

Theme song
Don't Care About 97 (話知你97)
Composer/Lyricist/Singer: Samuel Hui

Insert theme
Two Lonely People (兩個寂寞人)
Composer/Lyricist/Singer: Samuel Hui

Reception

Critical
Andrew Saroch of Far East Films gave the film a score of four out of five stars, praising the confidence and slickness of the three lead actors and its slapstick and moral message, describes it as "sophisticated comedy". In the book, The Hong Kong Filmography, 1977–1997: A Reference Guide to 1,100 Films Produced by British Hong Kong Studios, John Charles gave the film a score of 5/10 and describes it as "short on fresh ideas", but "fairly pleasing if one's expectations are held in check."

Box office
The film grossed HK$26,348,480 at the Hong Kong box office during its theatrical run from 24 August to 2 October 1990.

Awards and nominations

References

External links

Front Page at Hong Kong Cinemagic

1990 films
1990 comedy films
Hong Kong slapstick comedy films
Remakes of Hong Kong films
Chinese satirical films
1990s Cantonese-language films
Films about journalists
Films about tabloid journalism
Films set in Hong Kong
Films shot in Hong Kong
1990s satirical films
Films directed by Philip Chan
1990s Hong Kong films